Quintin Lamon Demps (born June 29, 1985) is an American football coach and former safety, who is the current head football coach of the Judson Eagles. He played college football at Texas-El Paso, and was drafted by the Philadelphia Eagles in the fourth round of the 2008 NFL Draft. Demps has also been a member of the Hartford Colonials, Houston Texans, Kansas City Chiefs, New York Giants and Chicago Bears.

Early years
Demps was born in San Antonio, Texas. He attended Theodore Roosevelt High School in San Antonio and was a student and a letterman in football and track. In football, as a junior, he led his team to the District Title and was a second-team All-District 26-5A selection. As a senior, he was named as an All-District 26-5A selection, an All-Greater San Antonio selection, and as an All-State Honorable Mention selection. Demps graduated from Theodore Roosevelt High School in 2003.

College career
Demps earned first-team All-Conference USA honors as a senior at UTEP in 2007, when he had a pair of 100-yard interception returns. Demps ranks second in school history with 17 interceptions.

Professional career

Philadelphia Eagles
Demps was drafted by the Philadelphia Eagles in the fourth round (117th overall) of the 2008 NFL Draft. He signed a four-year contract with the team on May 30, 2008.

Demps proved to be a very good kick returner for the Eagles in 2008, finishing fourth in the NFL in kick return yards.  He averaged 25.3 yards per kick return.  He scored his first career touchdown in week 13 against the Baltimore Ravens with a 100-yard kickoff return touchdown. In his rookie season, Demps had 18 tackles and one sack.

According to former Eagles defensive coordinator Jim Johnson, Demps was the favorite to start at free safety for the Eagles in 2009. However, Macho Harris beat Demps for the starting job.

Demps was waived by the Eagles on September 4, 2010.

Hartford Colonials
Demps was signed by the Hartford Colonials of the United Football League on November 8, 2010.

Houston Texans
Demps was signed by the Houston Texans on December 7, 2010, after the team placed defensive end Jesse Nading on injured reserve. On September 3, 2011, Demps was cut. Demps re-signed with the Texans on October 25, 2011, after Danieal Manning was lost for 4–6 weeks due to a broken leg. Demps was again resigned on April 4, 2012 to a multi-year contract.

Kansas City Chiefs
Demps was signed by the Kansas City Chiefs on May 22, 2013.

New York Giants
Demps was signed by the New York Giants on March 16, 2014. Demps intercepted 4 passes in his 2014 year with the Giants.

Houston Texans (second stint)
On August 19, 2015, Demps signed with the Houston Texans for a one-year contract. On April 7, 2016, the Texans re-signed Demps to a one-year deal.

Chicago Bears
On March 10, 2017, Demps signed a three-year contract with the Chicago Bears. On September 29, 2017, Demps was placed on injured reserve after suffering a fractured forearm in Week 3.

On February 26, 2018, Demps was released by the Bears.

Coaching career
Demps was named the Head Coach of Judson University's (Elgin, IL) Football Team on January 24, 2023. 

Prior to his current role, Demps served as the safeties coach for the 2022 season for Judson. In 2021 he was on staff at Trinity International and Grayslake Central High School.

References

External links
New York Giants bio
Houston Texans bio
University of Texas El-Paso football bio

1985 births
Living people
Judson High School alumni
Players of American football from San Antonio
African-American players of American football
American football safeties
UTEP Miners football players
Philadelphia Eagles players
Hartford Colonials players
Houston Texans players
Kansas City Chiefs players
New York Giants players
Chicago Bears players
21st-century African-American sportspeople
20th-century African-American people